Leo López may refer to:

Leo López (footballer) (born 1970), Spanish football manager and former footballer
Leopoldo López (born 1971), Venezuelan opposition leader

See also
Leonardo López (disambiguation)
Leopoldo López (disambiguation)
Leon Lopez (born 1979), English actor